The following articles contain lists of television stations in the Canadian Territories:

 List of television stations in Northwest Territories
 List of television stations in Nunavut
 List of television stations in Yukon